Jared Randall Tebo (born February22, 1987) is an American radio-controlled car racer from Raymore, Missouri who specializes in off-road racing driving for Mayako.

A child motocross racer, he took up radio-controlled racing at the age of 12 as an alternative to regular hospital visits due to motorcycle-related injuries. Since then he has amassed a number of victories, most significantly 16 ROAR Nationals and two IFMAR Worlds. He with Ryan Cavaileri and Ryan Maifield are referred to by Neobuggy as the Original Three, a trio of American off-road racers born in 1986 to 1987, active from 2000 and frequently appeared together in the champion finals.

Biography 
As a child, Tebo competed in motocross from the age of six, hoping to compete in the AMA Supercross Championship. However, regular injuries caused him to lose interest.
Wanting to compete in racing and attracted to the sound of glow plug engines, Tebo took up radio-controlled racing—he considered it to be "MX without the hospital visits." At that time, he had never owned a radio-controlled car.

His first car was a Team Associated RC10GT, a nitro powered stadium truck bought used by his father in March 1999. That November he competed in his first race, the Hot Rod Hobbies Shootout, where he attracted his first sponsor, O’Donnell Racing, a model engine manufacturer. Throughout his young career, he was mentored by Richard Saxton.

In 2000, after finishing fourth at the Dirt Nitro Challenge, Tebo signed up with Team Associated. His first 1/8 buggy race was the 2000 ROAR Nationals in Pleasant Hill, Missouri, where he finished second behind Brian Kinwald. After he earned a top qualifier (TQ) at the Silver State Nitro Challenge, he was signed up by Thunder Tiger, who later became a parent company to Team Associated, to drive 1:8 buggies whilst focusing with the latter for 1/10 off-roads, later departing Thunder Tiger for Kyosho. He won his first ROAR Nationals in 2004 in Las Vegas, Nevada when he won the 1/10 gas truck class.

In 2005, he left Kyosho for O’Donnell Racing's newly introduced car operations while driving for Team Associated in 1/10. As a result, his performance in 1/8 off-road dwindled while he helped develop O’Donnell's  Z01B buggy, but he managed to dominate the qualifying sessions at the 2008 ROAR Nationals, though he lacked he enjoyed with Thunder Tiger and Kyosho.
By the time he was a senior in high school, Tebo had won three ROAR Nationals titles; following graduation, he turned professional.

At the end of 2008, following his first IFMAR Worlds win, Tebo rejoined Kyosho on a full contract. He also departed from O'Donnell with Reedy and LRP for Team Orion. Subsequently, he became the first driver to win both buggy and truck at the ROAR Fuel Off-Road Nationals in 2010 and helped Kyosho to become a major championship contender As a result of his success, Tebo has a Mini-Z miniature model based on his racing color scheme.

Accomplishment
Listed as one of the ten best racers of all time by Radio Control Car Action in 2015.

Complete R/C racing summary 
Bold on results indicates top qualifier.

IFMAR World Championship results

ROAR National Championship results

References

External links 
 Official page
 Jared Tebo on rcranking.net

RC car racing drivers
American racing drivers
Associated Electrics people
Kyosho
People from Raymore, Missouri
American motorcycle racers
1987 births
Living people
Racing drivers from Los Angeles